Chupacabra vs. the Alamo is a 2013 made-for-TV movie about a pack of Chupacabra that use a tunnel to escape from Mexico to San Antonio, Texas. In their travels, however, they engage in many violent attacks. They begin to kill local residents and various drug cartel members.

The film stars Erik Estrada and Julia Benson as the protagonists. It was directed by Terry Ingram with the story by Peter Sullivan and Jeffrey Schenck. The movie was released in the U.S. and Canada initially and then later in Brazil and Germany under the titles Chupacabra and Chupacabra – Angriff der Killerbestien.

Plot
A group of corpses are found in a tunnel, where they were attacked and killed by Chupacabras. The following day, Carlos Seguin (Erik Estrada) and Tracy Taylor (Julia Benson) begin to investigate the killings and discover a dying man who has also been attacked by the Chupacabras. The dying man identifies his killers as "Diablo" (Spanish for the Devil).

Tracy soon discovers a pile of bones deeper within the tunnel. A Chupacabra attacks Tracy, but she is able to kill it and the dead body is then taken back to a lab to study.

Later in the film, DEA Agent Perez (Aleks Paunovic), one of Seguin's partners, is searching the field with his dog. Both are eventually killed by a pack of Chupacabras. Before the man is killed, he takes a picture of one of the Chupacabras, which Carlos later finds while investigating the murders.

The Chupacabras attack a group of teenagers during a Cinco de Mayo party, forcing Sienna (Nicole Muñoz), Carlos' daughter and one of her friends to hide inside the school. They are able to call Carlos, who is able to shoot the Chupacabras. However, later while they are recovering in their home, another pack of Chupacabras attacks, this time injuring Sienna and killing her friend, Brooke.

After being relieved by his boss, Carlos enlists the aid of his son's gang. One of his friends, DEA Agent Wilcox (Zak Santiago) also comes up to help with a tactical team. Using the signal from a transponder that Taylor tagged unto one of the Chupacabras, the group trace the pack of monsters into a nearby warehouse. However, they end up being ambushed by the Chupacabras with most of the tactical team being killed.

In the climax, Carlos and the group of survivors lead the Chupacabras to the Alamo, where a battle takes place. In the end, they kill all the Chupacabras by blowing up the Alamo.

Cast
 Erik Estrada as DEA Agent Carlos Seguin
 Julia Benson as Tracy Taylor
 Jorge Vargas as Tommy Seguin / "Spider" (Jorge Vargas Jr.)
 Vanesa Tomasino as DEA Agent Dani (Vanesa Tomasino Rodriguez)
 Nicole Muñoz as Sienna Seguin (Nicole Munoz)
 Chad Krowchuk as Crockett
 Brent McLaren as "Loco"
 Cassandra Fernandez as "Shorty"
 Bishop Brigante as "Gordo"
 Anja Savcic as Brooke
 Aleks Paunovic as DEA Agent Perez
 Zak Santiago as Commander Wilcox
 Jorge Montesi as DEA Director Collins
 Jose Os as Javier
 Dave Dimapilis as Juan
 Nick Mandryk as Colin
 Madison Smith as Darius
 Jessica Harmon as Jenny
 Matthew Harrison as Dr. Michael Fielding
 Frances Flanagan as Agatha
 David Nykl as Medical Examiner
 Samuel Patrick Chu as Sam

Production 
The movie was shot on location in San Antonio, Texas. It was distributed by Echo Bridge Home Entertainment in the USA and by Signature Entertainment in the UK on DVD. Digital Post Services  was used for ADR Recording in post production.

Promotion 
The tagline for the film was "Chupacabras attack with a vengeance and this time they're taking on the Alamo".

Reception 
The movie has no rating on the Rotten Tomatoes site and there are no readily available rating numbers (Nielsen or otherwise) for its airing.

References

External links 

Syfy original films
2013 television films
2013 films
2010s monster movies
Canadian horror television films
Canadian monster movies
Canadian horror thriller films
English-language Canadian films
2013 horror thriller films
2010s English-language films
2010s American films
2010s Canadian films